This is a list of the first ministers of Wales. The role of "First Secretary of Wales" was introduced in 1999 with the establishment of the National Assembly for Wales (now Senedd) following the 1997 referendum. The title of the role was changed to "First Minister of Wales" following the enactment of the Government of Wales Act 2006.

List of First Ministers of Wales 

* Incumbent's duration of term of office last updated: .

Timeline

Previous nominations

2021 
On 12 May 2021, Mark Drakeford was the only person nominated for the position (by Rebecca Evans), and was a subsequently recommended by the presiding officer to be appointed as First Minister.

2018

2016

2011 
On 11 May 2011, Carwyn Jones was the only person nominated for the position (by Janice Gregory), and was a subsequently recommended by the presiding officer to be appointed as First Minister.

2009 
On 9 December 2009, Carwyn Jones was the only person nominated for the position (by Rhodri Morgan), and was a subsequently recommended by the presiding officer to be appointed as First Minister.

2007 
On 25 May 2007, Rhodri Morgan was the only person nominated for the position (by Jane Hutt), and was a subsequently recommended by the presiding officer to be appointed as First Minister.

2003 
On 7 May 2003, Rhodri Morgan was the only person nominated for the position (by Lynne Neagle), and was a subsequently elected as First Minister.

2000 
On 9 February 2000, following the resignation of Alun Michael, the Assembly cabinet unanimously elected Rhodri Morgan as acting First Secretary.

1999 
On 12 May 1999, Alun Michael was the only person nominated for the position (by Rhodri Morgan and seconded by Ann Jones), and was a subsequently elected as First Secretary.

References

Notes

Dates are from World Statesmen and various BBC News Online articles from 1999 to 2003.

External links
  Roles and Responsibilities.
 Cabinet members and ministers Welsh Government: Cabinet and ministers.

Politics of Wales
Government of Wales
First Ministers of Wales
Welsh Government
1997 establishments in the United Kingdom
Wales
1999 establishments in Wales

First Minister of Wales